Al-Mu'tadid I, (died 1362) was the sixth Abbasid caliph of Cairo for the Mamluk Sultanate between 1352 and 1362.

Life 

Al-Mu'tadid I took the office after the death of his brother in the year 1352 CE. He remained in the office for ten years. He died in the year of 1362. He was a lover of the People of science. Under his reign Sultan Salah al-Din Salih was deposed in 755 AH and Nasser Hassan returned. He remained in the Sultanate for seven years and was killed in 762 AH. The Sultanate gave his nephew, Mansour ibn Muhammad al-Muzaffar Amir Haj, only two years to disembark.

References

Bibliography

1362 deaths
Cairo-era Abbasid caliphs
14th-century Abbasid caliphs
Year of birth unknown
Sons of Abbasid caliphs